MNZ or mnz may refer to:

 Manassas Regional Airport, USA (by IATA code)
 Museum of New Zealand
 Moni language, spoken in Indonesia (by ISO 639 code)
 Metronidazole, an antibiotic
 Maddie Ziegler, a dancer, and actress
 Mainz, Germany Rheinland-Pfalz